Barry Josephson (born April 2, 1956) is an American film producer and former music manager.

Life and career
After attending the McBurney School in New York City, Josephson graduated from American University, Washington DC in 1978, and was an active member of its American University School of Communication Alumni program. Josephson served as vice president, then President, of Production for Columbia Pictures from 1991 to 1997, and produced films and television for studios and networks such as The Walt Disney Company, 20th Century Fox, Sony Pictures Television, and AMC from 1997 onward.

Josephson began his career in entertainment at Landers/Roberts Productions, overseeing the music division's interest in feature film and television programming and there was involved with the popular sequel, Death Wish II (1982). Josephson later worked for Gallin/Morey & Associates, managing the careers of such performers as Paula Abdul, Patti LaBelle, Morris Day, and Whoopi Goldberg (including production work on her Grammy-winning album "Direct from Broadway").  During this time, Josephson also helped found Sandollar Films, whose production has included several of Dolly Parton's made-for-TV movies and specials; Tidy Endings, an HBO adaptation of Harvey Fierstein's play, Safe Sex; and such feature films as Gross Anatomy and True Identity (both 1989). Before moving to Columbia, Josephson worked with Joel Silver of Silver Pictures on Die Hard 2 and Predator 2 (both 1990), earned executive producer credit on both Ricochet and The Last Boy Scout (both 1991), and oversaw production of 14 episodes of the HBO series, Tales from the Crypt.

In 1991 he became Vice President of Production for Columbia Pictures, where his diverse background in film, TV, and music production came to bear upon the projects he oversaw. He remained at the studio for six years,  serving the last three as President of Production.  During his tenure at Columbia, Josephson was responsible for such popular films as In the Line of Fire (1993), Bad Boys (1995), Men in Black, Air Force One, The Fifth Element, and Anaconda (all 1997).

In 1997 Josephson, resigning as president at Columbia, entered into a partnership with director Barry Sonnenfeld. The two joined The Walt Disney Company as Sonnenfeld Josephson Worldwide Entertainment for a three-year production term. During this period they produced numerous film and television shows, including Wild Wild West (1999), Fantasy Island (1998) TV series, Big Trouble (2002), The Crew (2000) and Secret Agent Man (2000).

In 2001 he joined 20th Century Fox under Josephson Entertainment.  There he produced the critically acclaimed Enchanted, which garnered two Golden Globe nominations, four Critics' Choice Awards and three Academy Award nominations, and won a Critics' Choice Award for Best Family Film and a Phoenix Film Critics Society Award for Best Live Action Family Film. Other films he has produced include Hide and Seek (2005), Pat Croce: Moving In (2004) TV series, and Like Mike (2002). He acquired the rights in 2011 to make a film based on Julian Assange's autobiography.

Josephson was executive producer of the television series Bones (2005-2017). Most recently, he initiated the television adaptation of Washington's Spies, Alexander Rose's historical account of espionage during the American Revolution. Josephson, along with writer Craig Silverstein, executive-produced the adaptation, Turn: Washington's Spies, for AMC. The series premiered in April 2014.

The producer was a founding member of Comic Relief, the charitable organization which produces comedy concerts hosted by Robin Williams, Billy Crystal and Whoopi Goldberg in order to raise funds to help America's homeless and others in need. Josephson has also played pivotal roles in the creation of the HBO Aspen Comedy Festival, the Commitment to Life Benefit (supporting AIDS Project Los Angeles), and the Heart of Austin Film Festival.

Filmography
He was a producer in all films unless otherwise noted.

Film

Thanks

Television

As an actor

As writer

Miscellaneous crew

Thanks

References

External links
 
 Barry Josephson Bio at Fancast
 Josephson at Variety News
 Josephson Alumni at American University, Washington D.C.

1956 births
American film producers
Living people
American University School of Communication alumni